Matt Bernstein (born December 26, 1982) is a former American football fullback. He played college football at University of Wisconsin–Madison. He attempted to play in the Arena Football League after a stint in the National Football League with the Detroit Lions.
  He was inducted into the National Jewish Sports Hall of Fame in 2006. He has two brothers, Alex and Ben.

High school
Two-time Class C Player of the Year selection at Edgemont Junior – Senior High School in New York.
Played fullback, linebacker, and tight end.
Rushed for 1,885 yards and 25 scores as a junior.
Added 37 touchdowns and 2,002 yards on the ground and made 108 tackles with seven forced fumbles as a senior, earning the prep version of the Heisman Trophy for that performance.
Finished his career ranked third all-time in New York prep annals in scoring with 504 points.
Con Edison Scholar-Athlete

College
As a junior, Bernstein, who is Jewish, fasted in observance of the religious holiday Yom Kippur prior to a game against Penn State. Bernstein recovered from the fast with a "pregame IV bag, and during the game, moved on to turkey slices, fruit and the Penn State defense", according to ESPN.

Produced 53 touchdown-resulting blocks for a ground game that totaled 71 rushing touchdowns during his first three seasons at Wisconsin.
Averaged 10 knockdown blocks per game and made 11 touchdown resulting blocks as a pass protector.
Preseason All-American and All-Big Ten Conference first-team selection by The NFL Draft Report as a senior.
Inducted into the National Jewish Sports Hall of Fame in 2006.
Started every game as a junior and finished third on the team with a career-high 300 rushing yards and a touchdown.
Played in every game in 2003 as a sophomore and emerged as the starting fullback.
Elroy Hirsch Football Scholarship.
Academic All-Big Ten Conference selection as a redshirt freshman.
Signed by the Lions as an undrafted free agent.

See also
List of select Jewish football players

References

External links
Video highlights of Bernstein.
"Leader of Edgemont High Team Runs Through the Competition", profile of Bernstein in New York Times, December 3, 2000, by Chuck Slater.

1982 births
Living people
American football fullbacks
Detroit Lions players
Philadelphia Soul players
Wisconsin Badgers football players
People from Scarsdale, New York
Sportspeople from Westchester County, New York
Players of American football from New York (state)
Jewish American sportspeople
Edgemont Junior – Senior High School alumni
21st-century American Jews